U series or U-series may refer to:

 HTC U series, Android smartphones
 IdeaPad U series, Lenovo consumer laptop computers
 Sony U series, subnotebook computers
 U-series dating, uranium–thorium dating
 Yepp U series, USB key MP3 players

See also
 T series (disambiguation)
 V series (disambiguation)
 Series (disambiguation)